André Willequet (3 January 1921 – 1 July 1998) was a Belgian abstract sculptor.

External links
 Official Website André Willequet

Belgian sculptors
1921 births
1998 deaths